The England cricket team toured Ireland for one One Day International match on 13 June 2006, as a warm-up for the ODI series against Sri Lanka. This was Ireland's first ever One Day International.

ODI series

Only ODI

References

2006
International cricket competitions in 2006
2006 in English cricket
2006 in Irish cricket